Policy banks of China, policy lenders  or institutional banks refer to two Chinese banks set up by State Council of China in 1994, namely The Export–Import Bank of China (Exim) and the Agricultural Development Bank of China (ADBC). The two banks aim at implementing economic policies of the government and conducting non-profit businesses in particular sectors. China Development Bank (CDB) used to be one of such banks before its shift to a corporation in 2008.

Each of the two is dedicated to a specific lending purpose. ADBC provides funds for agricultural development projects in rural areas and Exim Bank of China specializes in trade financing, investment and international economic cooperation. The former member CDB specializes in financing of infrastructure, energy and transportation.

Other non-bank financial institutions are referred to as policy entities. Sinosure is described as "China's only policy-oriented insurance company" and offers insurance products for Chinese exporters. Sino Guarantee plays a quasi-policy role in Chinese capital markets.

See also
 Banking in China

References 

Banking in China